Y Garn is a mountain in Snowdonia, North Wales, part of the Glyderau.

It is the tenth-highest peak in Wales. Moderate snow accumulations can take place on the western-sloping side of the mountain from October to May.

The south-westerly side of the mountain slopes gently down to the Nant Peris valley. The other, north-easterly side is of a different character, consisting of two steep-sided cwms, Cwm Clyd and Cwm Cywion, and finally Llyn Idwal and Ogwen Cottage. Along the ridge to the north lies Elidir Fawr, while to the south-east is the top of the Twll Du and Glyder Fawr.

In 2011 three people were walking on Y Garn when they went over a cornice overhanging a ridge. About 50 metres of snow collapsed when the cornice gave way creating an avalanche and a person died when they fell 150 metres.

See also
 Snowdon

References

External links
 Photos of Y Garn

Marilyns of Wales
Hewitts of Wales
Mountains and hills of Snowdonia
Nuttalls
Furths
Mountains and hills of Gwynedd
Llanberis
Llandygai